Arif Sahin (born 22 December 1985) is a Turkish footballer who plays for Elazığ Belediyespor in the Turkish TFF Third League.

References

Arif Şahin Boluspor'da, futbolumuz.com,

External links

1985 births
Living people
Turkish footballers
Sportspeople from Eskişehir
Samsunspor footballers
Süper Lig players
TFF First League players
Association football midfielders